Samuel Rush Watkins (June 26, 1839 – July 20, 1901) was an American writer and humorist. He fought through the entire American Civil War and saw action in many battles. Today, he is best known for his memoir "Co. Aytch" (1882), which recounts his life as a soldier in the 1st Tennessee Infantry Regiment.

Soldier
In May 1861, 21-year-old Sam Watkins of Maury County, Tennessee, rushed to join the army when his state left the Union. He became part of Company H (or Co. "Aytch," as he called it), 1st Tennessee Infantry Regiment, fought from Shiloh to Nashville, and acted as one of only seven men who remained in the company when it was surrendered to U.S. Major-General W. T. Sherman in North Carolina, April 1865. When he died at 62, Watkins was buried with full military honors.

"Co. Aytch"
In 1881, with a "house full of young 'rebels' clustering about my elbows," Watkins began to chronicle his experiences in the First Tennessee Regiment. "Co. Aytch" is considered to be one of the great memoirs written by a soldier of the field. Originally published as a serial newspaper column from 1881 to 1882 in The Columbia Herald, his stories were collected and printed in book form in 1882. The charming prose captures the experience of the common private soldier, from the hardships of camp life to the horrors of battle, the camaraderie of a unit to the loss of a brother, the pride in one's state to the devastation of defeat.

Memorials
Camp No. 29 (established 1986) of the Sons of Confederate Veterans in Columbia, Tennessee, is named after him.

In popular culture
Watkins is featured and quoted in Ken Burns' 1990 documentary titled The Civil War and in the film titled Civil War:  The Untold Story  (See specific quotes from Watkins in Wikiquotes .)

The song "Kennesaw Line" by Don Oja-Dunaway tells a heart-breaking vignette of the Battle of Kennesaw Mountain on the morning of June 27, 1864, from the perspective of Sam Watkins, with part of the lyrics directly paraphrasing his description from the book "Company Aytch" (see the section entitled "Dead Angle").

See also 
 American literary regionalism
 American realism
 List of humorists
 The Civil War (1990)

References
Notes

Sources

Further reading

External links

 
 Samuel R. Watkins Camp No. 29 of the Sons of Confederate Veterans
 
 

1839 births
1901 deaths
19th-century American male writers
19th-century American short story writers
19th-century Presbyterians
American autobiographers
American columnists
American humorists
American male non-fiction writers
American male short story writers
19th-century American memoirists
American Presbyterians
Burials in Tennessee
Confederate States Army soldiers
Deaths in Tennessee
Farmers from Tennessee
People from Maury County, Tennessee
People from Mount Pleasant, Tennessee
People of Tennessee in the American Civil War
Writers from Tennessee